Dobrovolshchina is a rural locality (a settlement) in Sverdlovsky Selsoviet, Khabarsky District, Altai Krai, Russia. The population was 46 as of 2013. It was founded in 1909. There is 1 street.

Geography 
Dobrovolshchina is located 42 km south of Khabary (the district's administrative centre) by road. Sverdlovskoye is the nearest rural locality.

References 

Rural localities in Khabarsky District